Ianeira or Ianira (Ancient Greek: Ἰάνειρά means 'lady of the Ionians') or Janira was a name attributed to three characters in Greek mythology.

Ianeira, one of the 3,000 Oceanids, water-nymph daughters of the Titans Oceanus and Tethys. According to the Homeric Hymn, she one of the "deep-bosomed daughters of Oceanus" gathering flowers with Persephone when she was abducted by Hades.
Ianeira, one of the 50 Nereids, marine-nymph daughters of the "Old Man of the Sea" Nereus and the Oceanid Doris. She and her other sisters appear to Thetis when she cries out in sympathy for the grief of Achilles at the slaying of his friend Patroclus.
Ianeira, possible spouse of Capaneus.

Notes

References
 Hesiod, Theogony, in The Homeric Hymns and Homerica with an English Translation by Hugh G. Evelyn-White, Cambridge, MA., Harvard University Press; London, William Heinemann Ltd. 1914. Online version at the Perseus Digital Library.
 Homer, The Iliad with an English Translation by A.T. Murray, Ph.D. in two volumes. Cambridge, MA., Harvard University Press; London, William Heinemann, Ltd. 1924. Online version at the Perseus Digital Library.
 Homeric Hymn to Demeter (2), in The Homeric Hymns and Homerica with an English Translation by Hugh G. Evelyn-White, Cambridge, MA., Harvard University Press; London, William Heinemann Ltd. 1914. Online version at the Perseus Digital Library.
 Hyginus, Gaius Julius, Fabulae in Apollodorus' Library and Hyginus' Fabulae: Two Handbooks of Greek Mythology, Translated, with Introductions by R. Scott Smith and Stephen M. Trzaskoma, Hackett Publishing Company,  2007. .
Pseudo-Apollodorus, The Library with an English Translation by Sir James George Frazer, F.B.A., F.R.S. in 2 Volumes, Cambridge, MA, Harvard University Press; London, William Heinemann Ltd. 1921. . Online version at the Perseus Digital Library. Greek text available from the same website.

Oceanids
Nereids
Deities in the Iliad